Willie Thomson (born ) was a Scottish professional golfer who played during the late 19th century.

Early life
Thomson was born in Scotland .

Golf career
In total, Thomson had three top-10 finishes in The Open Championship. In the 1874 Open Championship and 1889 Open Championship he finished tied for sixth and tenth, respectively.  His best performance came in the 1876 Open Championship where he finished tied for fourth place.

Death
Thomson's place and date of death are unknown.

Results in The Open Championship

Note: Thomson played only in The Open Championship.

DNP = Did not play
? = played, finish unknown
"T" indicates a tie for a place
Yellow background for top-10

References

Scottish male golfers
19th-century Scottish people
19th-century sportsmen
1850s births
Year of birth uncertain
Year of death missing